Mergan Chetty (born 17 January 1968) is a South African politician and a Member of Parliament (MP) for the Democratic Alliance (DA).

He was elected to the National Assembly of South Africa in the 2019 South African general election.

Since June 2019, he served as the Shadow Deputy Minister of International Relations and Cooperation in the Shadow Cabinet of Mmusi Maimane. Following John Steenhuisen's election as leader of the DA, he was appointed to his shadow cabinet in the same position.

He has been a member of the Portfolio Committee on International Relations and Cooperation (National Assembly Committees) since 27 June 2019.

References

External links 
 National Assembly biography

Living people
Members of the National Assembly of South Africa
Democratic Alliance (South Africa) politicians
People from KwaZulu-Natal
Members of the National Council of Provinces
1968 births